Jarl is a name of Scandinavian origin.  Notable people with the name include:

As a given name 
 Jarl-Thure Eriksson (born 1944), Finnish scientist
 Jarl Kulle (1927–1997), Swedish actor and director
 Jarl Lander (1944–2014), Swedish politician
 Jarl-André Storbæk (born 1978), Norwegian football player
 Jarl Wahlström (1918–1999), 12th General of The Salvation Army
 Jarl Espen Ygranes (born 1979), Norwegian ice hockey player

As a surname 
 Sofia Jarl (born 1977), Swedish politician
 Stefan Jarl (born 1941), Swedish film director

Danish masculine given names
Finnish masculine given names
Norwegian masculine given names
Swedish masculine given names